Ethan Frome is a 1911 book by American author Edith Wharton. It is set in the fictitious town of Starkfield, Massachusetts. The novel has been adapted into a film of the same name.

Plot
The novel is a framed narrative. The framing story concerns an unnamed male narrator spending a winter in Starkfield while in the area on business. He spots a limping, quiet man around the village, who is somehow compelling in his demeanor and carriage. This is Ethan Frome, who is a lifelong resident and a local fixture of the community. Frome is described by the narrator as "the most striking figure in Starkfield", "the ruin of a man" with a "careless powerful look ... in spite of a lameness checking each step like the jerk of a chain". Curious, the narrator sets out to learn about him. He learns that Frome's limp arose from having been injured in a "smash-up" twenty-four years before, but further details are not forthcoming, and the narrator fails to learn much more from Frome's fellow townspeople other than that Ethan's attempt at higher education decades before was thwarted by the sudden illness of his father following an injury, forcing his return to the farm to assist his parents, never to leave again. Because people seem not to wish to speak other than in vague and general terms about Frome's past, the narrator's curiosity grows, but he learns little more.

Chance circumstances arise that allow the narrator to hire Frome as his driver for a week. A severe snowstorm during one of their journeys forces Frome to allow the narrator to shelter at his home one night. Just as the two are entering Frome's house, the prologue ends and the framed story begins. The narration switches from the first-person narrator of the prologue to a limited third-person narrator. We then embark on the "first" chapter (Chapter I), which takes place twenty-four years prior.

In Chapter I, Ethan is waiting outside a church dance for Mattie, his wife's cousin, who has for a year lived with Ethan and his sickly wife, Zeena (Zenobia), in order to help out around the house and farm. Mattie is given the occasional night off to entertain herself in town as partial recompense for helping care for the Fromes, and Ethan has the duty of walking her home. It quickly becomes clear that Ethan has deep feelings for Mattie. Passing the graveyard, he thinks in an intense moment of foreshadowing that, "We'll always go on living here together, and some day she'll lie there beside me." It also becomes clear that Zeena has observed enough to understand that he has these feelings and that she resents them.

When Zeena leaves for an overnight visit to seek treatment for her various complaints and symptoms in a neighboring town, Ethan is excited to have an evening alone with Mattie. During this evening, the narrator reveals small actions that show that they each have feelings for the other, including a lingering of touching hands on the milk jug, although neither openly declares their love. Mattie makes supper and retrieves from a high shelf Zeena's treasured pickle dish, which Zeena, in a symbol of her stingy nature, never uses, in order to protect it. Mattie uses it to present Ethan with a simple supper, and disaster ensues when the Fromes' cat jumps on the table and knocks it off, shattering it beyond repair. Ethan tries to help by setting the dish's pieces neatly in the cupboard, presenting the false impression of wholeness if not examined closely, with plans to purchase some glue and fix it as soon as he can.

In the morning, Ethan's hopes for more private time with Mattie are foiled by the presence of his hired man. Ethan then goes into town to buy glue for the broken pickle dish, and upon his return finds that Zeena has also come home. Zeena retreats upstairs, proclaiming her illness, and refusing supper because she is not hungry. There, she informs Ethan that she plans to send Mattie away and has already hired another girl to replace her, claiming that she needs someone more efficient because her health is failing more rapidly than ever.

Ethan is angry and frustrated to the point of panic by the thought of losing Mattie, and he is also worried for Mattie, who has no other place to go and no way to support herself in the world. He returns to the kitchen and joins Mattie, and tries to eat, but he is distraught and suddenly blurts out Zeena's plans to send Mattie away. Mattie reacts with shock but rapid acceptance, trying to calm Ethan, while Ethan becomes more agitated and begins to insist that he will not let her go. Ethan kisses her. Moments later, they are interrupted by Zeena, who has decided that she is hungry after all. After supper, Zeena discovers the broken pickle dish and is heartbroken and enraged; this betrayal cements her determination to send Mattie away.

Ethan, miserable at the thought of losing Mattie and worried sick about her fate, considers running away with Mattie, but he lacks the money to do so. He feels that he cannot abandon Zeena because he knows that she would neither be able to run the farm nor sell it (the poor quality of the place has been discussed at several points in the story already). Every plan he thinks of is impossible to carry out, and he remains in despair and frantically trying to think of a way to change this one more turn of events against his ability to have a happy life.

The next morning, Zeena describes her specific and imminent plans for sending Mattie on her way. Panicked, Ethan rushes into town to try to get a cash advance from a customer for a load of lumber in order to have the money with which to abscond with Mattie. His plan is unhinged by guilt, however, when his customer's wife expresses compassion, understanding, and empathy for Ethan's lot, which has involved the repeated duty to care for others, first his parents, then his sickly wife. He realizes that, of all people, he cannot cheat this kindly woman and her husband out of money, since she is one of the few people who have ever seemed to have seen or openly acknowledged Ethan's lifelong plight, as well as his honor in fulfilling his duties.

Ethan comes back to the farm and picks up Mattie to take her to the train station. They stop at a hill upon which they had once planned to go sledding and decide to sled together as a way of delaying their sad parting, after which they anticipate never seeing each other again. After their first run, Mattie suggests a suicide pact: that they go down again, and steer the sled directly into a tree, so they will never be parted and so that they may spend their last moments together. Ethan first refuses to go through with the plan, but in his despair that mirrors Mattie's, he ultimately agrees, and they get on the sled, clutching each other. On the way down, a vision of Zeena's face startles Ethan into swerving a bit, but he corrects their course, and they crash headlong and at high speed into the elm tree. Ethan regains consciousness after the accident but Mattie lies beside him, "cheeping" in pain like a small wounded animal. Ethan is also injured, and the reader is left to understand that this was the "smash-up" that left Ethan with a permanent limp.

The epilogue returns to the framing story and the first-person narrator point of view of the prologue. The framing story resumes precisely where it left off: just as Frome and his visitor, the narrator, enter the Frome household in the story's present. The narrator hears a complaining female voice, and it is easy to assume that it belongs to the never-happy Zeena, but in the final twist of the story, it emerges that it is in fact Mattie, who now lives with the Fromes due to having been paralyzed in the accident. Her misery over her plight and dependence has embittered and "soured" her, and, with roles reversed, Zeena is now forced to care for her as well as Ethan. Further illustrating the psychosomatic nature of most of Zeena's previous complaints, she has now found the strength through necessity to be the caregiver rather than being the invalid. In an agonizing irony, Ethan and Mattie have gotten their wish to stay together, but in mutual unhappiness and discontent, with Mattie helpless and paralyzed, and with Zeena as a constant presence between the two of them.

Development
The story of Ethan Frome had initially begun as a French-language composition that Wharton had to write while studying the language in Paris, but several years later she took the story up again and transformed it into the novel it now is, basing her sense of New England culture and place on her ten years of living at The Mount, her home in Lenox, Massachusetts. She would read portions of her novel-in-progress each day to her good friend Walter Berry, who was an international lawyer. Wharton likely based the story of Ethan and Mattie's sledding experience on an accident that she had heard about in 1904 in Lenox. Five people total were involved in the real-life accident, four girls and one boy. They crashed into a lamppost while sledding down Courthouse Hill in Lenox. A girl named Emily Hazel Crosby was killed in the accident. Wharton learned of the accident from one of the girls who survived, Kate Spencer, when the two became friends while both worked at the Lenox Library. Kate Spencer suffered from a hip injury in the accident and also had facial injuries. It is among the few works by Wharton with a rural setting. Wharton found the notion of the tragic sledding crash to be irresistible as a potential extended metaphor for the wrongdoings of a secret love affair.

Lenox is also where Wharton had traveled extensively and had come into contact with at least one of the victims of the accident; victims of the accident are buried in graves nearby Wharton family members. In her introduction to the novel, Wharton talks of the "outcropping granite" of New England, the austerity of its land and the stoicism of its people. The connection between land and people is very much a part of naturalism; the environment is a powerful shaper of man's fate, and the novel dwells insistently on the cruelty of Starkfield's winters.

Reception
The New York Times called Ethan Frome "a compelling and haunting story." Wharton was able to write an appealing book and separate it from her other works, where her characters in Ethan Frome are not of the elite upper class. However, the problems that the characters endure are still consistently the same, where the protagonist has to decide whether or not to fulfill their duty or follow their heart. She began writing Ethan Frome in the early 1900s when she was still married. The novel was criticized by Lionel Trilling as lacking in moral or ethical significance. Trilling wrote that the ending is "terrible to contemplate," but that "the mind can do nothing with it, can only endure it."

Jeffrey Lilburn notes that some find "the suffering endured by Wharton's characters is excessive and unjustified," but others see the difficult moral questions addressed and note that it "provides insightful commentary on the American economic and cultural realities that produced and allowed such suffering." Wharton was always careful to label Ethan Frome as a tale rather than a novel. Critics did take note of this when reviewing the book. Elizabeth Ammons compared the work to fairy tales. She found a story that is "as moral as the classic fairy tale" and that functions as a "realistic social criticism." The moral concepts, as described by Ammons, are revealed with all of the brutality of Starkfield's winters. Comparing Mattie Silver and Zeena Frome, Ammons suggests that Mattie would grow as frigid and crippled as Zeena, so long as such women remain isolated and dependent. Wharton cripples Mattie, says Lilburn, but has her survive in order to demonstrate the cruelty of the culture surrounding women in that period.

Adaptations
The book was adapted to the 1993 film of the same name, directed by John Madden, and starring Liam Neeson, Patricia Arquette, Joan Allen and Tate Donovan.

Cathy Marston adapted the book to a one-act ballet titled Snowblind for the San Francisco Ballet. The ballet premiered in 2018, with Ulrik Birkkjaer as Ethan, Sarah Van Patten as Zeena and Mathilde Froustey as Mattie.

References

External links

 
 
 
  (2 versions)
 1953 Best Plays radio adaptation at Internet Archive

1911 American novels
Adultery in novels
American novels adapted into films
Frame stories
Novels adapted into ballets
Novels by Edith Wharton
Novels set in Massachusetts